Valentín Barrios González (born 7 April 1942) is a Spanish professional golfer. He won the 1971 Madrid Open, the 1972 Algarve Open and was one of the winning pair in the 1972 Marlboro Nations' Cup. He represented Spain three times in the World Cup.

Golf career
Barrios was runner-up in the 1963 Open de España but he was at his best during the late 1960s and early 1970s. He was runner-up in the 1970 Italian BP Open and the 1970 German Open and won the 1971 Madrid Open and the 1972 Algarve Open. Representing Spain, he partnered with Ángel Gallardo and won the 1972 Marlboro Nations' Cup, beating the Welsh pair of Brian Huggett and David Vaughan in the final. He also won the 1973 Lancia D'Oro invitation tournament at Biella Golf Club near Magnano, Italy.

Barrios played on the European Tour in the 1970s. He never won a European Tour event but one the European circuit events he won, the 1971 Madrid Open, would be incorporated into the European Tour while the Lancia d'Oro, which he won in 1973, was part of the European Tour the previous season. His best finishes on the European Tour was second place which he recorded three times: at the 1972 Spanish Open, 1972 Italian Open, and 1974 Madrid Open. He twice lost in a playoff, at the third playoff hole against Antonio Garrido in the 1972 Spanish Open and at the first playoff hole at the 1974 Madrid Open.

Professional wins (3)
1971 Madrid Open
1972 Algarve Open
1973 Lancia d'Oro

Playoff record
European Tour playoff record (0–2)

Results in major championships

Note: Barrios only played in the Open Championship.
CUT = missed the half-way cut (3rd round cut in 1969 Open Championship)
"T" = tied

Team appearances
World Cup (representing Spain): 1966, 1972, 1973
Double Diamond International (representing Continental Europe): 1972
Marlboro Nations' Cup (representing Spain): 1972 (winners), 1973
Hennessy Cognac Cup (representing Continent of Europe): 1974

References

External links

Spanish male golfers
European Tour golfers
Golfers from Madrid
1942 births
Living people
20th-century Spanish people
21st-century Spanish people